Howard Eskin (born April 29, 1951) is an American sports anchor at Fox29 in Philadelphia and a sports radio personality for WIP-FM 94.1. He also works as a sideline reporter for the Eagles Radio Network.

Early life
Eskin spent his first eight years growing up in Mt. Airy, Philadelphia. He then moved to Rhawnhurst, Philadelphia and lived there until he graduated from high school. He attended Northeast High School in Philadelphia were he graduated in 1968. He grew up as a fan of playing, and watching, sports including baseball, football and basketball.

Career
Eskin got his start in local radio at WFIL-AM in 1972 when evening shift disc jockey George Michael hired him to be his engineer. 

In the mid-1980s, Eskin co-hosted with John DeBella on WMMR's Morning zoo, their combination was advertised as "Sports Rock". On television Eskin helped launch Fox 29 Station WTXF-TV's Ten O’Clock News as part of its original anchor team from 1986 to 1991. 

In 1982, Eskin joined KYW-TV as their sportscaster. Eskin joined 610 WIP, a newly created station, in 1986, which had one of the first full-time sports-talk radio themes in the United States. Eskin's years on the air allowed him to frequently have special guest athletes or other sports figures on his program, with memorable interactions with Charles Barkley, Freddie Mitchell, Terrell Owens, Lenny Dykstra, Andre Iguodala, Bernard Hopkins, Jayson Werth and Cole Hamels.

In 1992, he rejoined KYW-TV and then moved to WCAU-TV in 1996, where he served as a host and contributor to Sports Final until April, 2005. In addition to his radio and television presence, Eskin wrote a column for the Philadelphia Daily News in the early 1990s. He was also a contributor to The George Michael Sports Machine and ESPN's First Take.

On September 20, 2007, Howard Eskin logged his 5,000th radio show, more than anyone else in the country at the time, and celebrated his 25th year in television that same year. Guests on the show included Charles Barkley, Terrell Owens, and Billy Cunningham.

On September 2, 2011, Eskin hosted his last 3:00 to 7:00 PM show on WIP after nearly 6,000 shows and 25 years in that slot.

Notable reports
While at KYW-TV, Eskin broke the story of Eagles owner Leonard Tose having personal financial trouble and was considering selling the team to buyers, who would move the team. 

Eskin's breaking stories included one that former Philadelphia Phillies general manager Ed Wade would be fired if the Phillies did not make the playoffs. Wade was subsequently fired by the Phillies on October 10, 2005.  He unsuccessfully "campaigned" for the GM position, that was eventually filled by former Toronto Blue Jays GM Pat Gillick.

Eskin also covered the negotiation and subsequent breakdown between Comcast and a group led by Julius Erving and Will Smith to buy the Philadelphia 76ers.  Howard's involvement in the negotiation entailed a request help from Allen L. Rothenberg, a prominent Philadelphia attorney, who was a regular at Eskin's synagogue.

On-air personality at WIP 
Though Eskin regularly initiates calls with comments such as "never had a bad day in my life" or "another day in paradise", he is known to be short-tempered and easily angered on his radio show. He frequently refers to a caller as a "genius" or "chief" (both sarcastically), a "dope", an "idiot", a "nitwit", a "creep" or a "moron".

Eskin has also been known to lead long-term "campaigns" to have players traded from Philadelphia teams such as former Philadelphia Phillies' outfielder Bobby Abreu for alleged lackadaisical defense and lack of clutch hitting, and Sixers' guard Allen Iverson for his allegedly selfish play, though he has subsequently praised Iverson. Eskin's last public stunt was organizing a mock funeral to celebrate Terrell Owens's demise with the Philadelphia Eagles during their 2005 season.

He refers to Dallas Cowboys' fans as "cock-a-roaches" and will tell callers if they are worried about their team then they should "get a dog." He also refers to the Pittsburgh Steelers as the "Stillers" and stereotypes their fans as IronCity beer drinkers, smokers, and generally of a low-class demeanor.

Prior to the legalization of sports gambling in Pennsylvania, Eskin was known for having an affinity towards sports gambling on air. On Friday afternoons during football season, he often would ask a "handicapping expert" on as a guest. In addition, he is the self-proclaimed "King of Monday Night" due to his successful track record in picking Monday Night Football games correctly. On his current Saturday show during the NFL season, he reviews and picks games with Marc Lawrence, a sports handicapper.

Controversy
During a 1996 controversy involving former Philadelphia Flyer Eric Lindros selling game tickets to mafia members, Eskin interviewed reputed Philly mob boss Joey Merlino about the Mafioso's sitting in Lindros' seats at a Flyers' game. Merlino denied getting the seats from Lindros.

In 2000, Eskin was suspended and forced to give an on-air apology to the organizers of the Miss America pageant for saying on the air that the contest was rigged.

During the beginning of the 2007 Phillies season, Eskin criticized the team for not taking chances with their payroll and running their sports franchise like a "department store". After a 3–9 start to the team's 2007 season, Eskin had a publicized confrontation with manager Charlie Manuel, implying that he was not tough enough on his players. Manuel responded by threatening to fight Eskin and had to be physically restrained by hitting coach Milt Thompson.

Personal life
Eskin's nickname, King, was given to him by Pete Rose. The Broadcast Pioneers of Philadelphia inducted Eskin into their Hall of Fame in 2011.

Eskin often touts his affinity for a wardrobe that includes expensive jewelry and clothing, particularly fur coats for Eagles home games. He has been nicknamed "The King of Bling". Eskin sold a bobblehead doll of him wearing a fur coat, with the proceeds going to charity, in 2004 and 2005, which raised $75,000 for charity. The first 100 dolls in the 2005 version came with a special small diamond chip in his "bling" necklace.

In 1997, Eskin was revealed as the "prominent Philadelphia sportscaster" who had sent a dozen roses to a woman five days before she was murdered by her husband. The woman had posted a fake profile on a dating site, identifying herself as a 25-year-old named "Brandice". A note sent with the roses was read during the guilty plea of Raymond Stumpf by his attorney: "Dear Brandice It was absolutely wonderful getting to know you. Hope to get to know you better. You were very thought-provoking and I do love your name. Love, Howard." Eskin subsequently denied ever meeting with her and said the roses were nothing more than an innocent attempt to brighten a lonely woman's day. At his sentencing, in Montgomery County Court, Raymond Stumpf stated "I think the worst part was probably the day the roses came." Stumpf was sentenced to a term of 7 1/2 to 15 years for the killing.

He has sponsored numerous charity and fund-raising events off-the-air to benefit a particular humanitarian cause throughout the years, most recently for victims of Hurricane Katrina. He also does a bike-riding fundraiser to raise awareness for autism. On the air, he has advocated for issues such as public smoking bans and medical tort reform.

Eskin's son Brett "Spike" Eskin was a radio DJ on Philadelphia station WYSP. Spike Eskin later worked as the Brand Manager at 94.1 WIP and is currently the Vice President of Programming at WFAN New York.

References

External links

Sportsradio 610 WIP
Select podcasts of the Howard Eskin Show
Howard Eskin's website
Howard Eskin on Twitter
Broadcast Pioneers of Philadelphia website

1949 births
Living people
National Football League announcers
American sports radio personalities
Radio personalities from Philadelphia